USS Little Rock may refer to the following ships of the United States Navy:

It is currently part of the museum at Buffalo and Erie County Naval & Military Park.
, is a  launched in 2015 and commissioned in 2017.

United States Navy ship names